The Association of Tennis Professionals (ATP) Tour is the elite professional tennis circuit organised by the ATP. The 1999 ATP Tour calendar comprises the Grand Slam tournaments, supervised by the International Tennis Federation (ITF), the ATP Super 9, the ATP Championship Series, the ATP World Series, the ATP World Team Cup, the ATP Tour World Championships and the Grand Slam Cup (organised by the ITF). Also included in the 1999 calendar are the Davis Cup and the Hopman Cup, which do not distribute ranking points, and are both organised by the ITF.

In April 1999 ATP signed a $1.2 billion 10-year-deal with the sports marketing agency ISL Worldwide to promote the sport. The deal gave ISL the commercial rights for the Super-9 tournaments as well as the ATP World Championship. The ATP also introduced a simplified ranking system and made participation in the Super-9 events mandatory for top players.

Schedule 
This is the complete schedule of events on the 1999 calendar, with player progression documented from the quarterfinals stage.

Key

January

February

March

April

May

June

July

August

September

October

November

Statistical information 
These tables present the number of singles (S), doubles (D), and mixed doubles (X) titles won by each player and each nation during the season, within all the tournament categories of the 1999 ATP Tour: the Grand Slam tournaments, the ATP Tour World Championships and the Grand Slam Cup, the ATP Super 9, the ATP Championship Series, and the ATP World Series. The players/nations are sorted by: 1) total number of titles (a doubles title won by two players representing the same nation counts as only one win for the nation); 2) cumulated importance of those titles (one Grand Slam win equalling two Super 9 wins, one year-end championships win equalling one-and-a-half Super 9 win, one Super 9 win equalling two International Series Gold wins, one International Series Gold win equalling two International Series wins); 3) a singles > doubles > mixed doubles hierarchy; 4) alphabetical order (by family names for players).

Key

Titles won by player

Titles won by nation

ATP rankings 
These are the ATP rankings of the top twenty singles players, doubles players, and the top ten doubles teams on the ATP Tour, at the end of the 1998 ATP Tour, and of the 1999 season, with number of rankings points, number of tournaments played, year-end ranking in 1998, highest and lowest position during the season (for singles and doubles individual only, as doubles team rankings are not calculated over a rolling year-to-date system), and number of spots gained or lost from the 1998 to the 1999 year-end rankings.

Singles

Doubles (individual)

Doubles (team)

See also 
 1999 WTA Tour
 Association of Tennis Professionals
 International Tennis Federation

References 
General

 
 
 

Specific

External links 
 Association of Tennis Professionals (ATP) official website
 International Tennis Federation (ITF) official website

 
ATP Tour
ATP Tour seasons